Pierre-Charles Jombert (1748 - 1825) was a French painter.

Jombert is primarily known through his works. He took first prize of the Prix de Rome in 1772 for his work The Punishment of the Arrogant Niobe by Diana and Apollo. The oil sketch of this work resides at the Metropolitan Museum of Art, while the larger finished painting can be found at the École nationale supérieure des Beaux-Arts.

References

1748 births
1825 deaths
18th-century French painters
French male painters
19th-century French painters
Prix de Rome for painting
19th-century French male artists
18th-century French male artists